Pentamminechlororhodium dichloride is the dichloride salt of the coordination complex .  It is a yellow, water-soluble solid.  The salt is an intermediate in the purification of rhodium from its ores.

As shown by X-ray crystallography, the salt consists of the octahedral complex  and two chloride counterions.  It forms from the reaction of rhodium trichloride and ammonia in ethanol.  Two chloride anions are labile, whereas the coordinated chloride ligand is not.

Related compounds
Chloropentamminecobalt chloride

References

Chlorides
Rhodium(III) compounds
Ammine complexes
Coordination complexes
Chloro complexes